Epicaerus imbricatus, the imbricated snout beetle, is a species of broad-nosed weevil in the family Curculionidae. It is found in North America.

References

Further reading

 
 

Entiminae
Articles created by Qbugbot
Beetles described in 1824